Eladio Silvestre Graells (born 18 November 1940 in Sabadell, Barcelona, Catalonia) is a retired Spanish footballer, who played as a defender.

Honours
Barcelona
Inter-Cities Fairs Cup: 1965–1966
Spanish Cup: 1962–63, 1967–68, 1970–71

References

External links
 
 National team data 
 
 FC Barcelona archives 
 FC Barcelona profile
 

1940 births
Living people
Sportspeople from Sabadell
Spanish footballers
Footballers from Catalonia
Association football defenders
La Liga players
FC Barcelona players
UE Lleida players
Hércules CF players
Gimnàstic de Tarragona footballers
Spain youth international footballers
Spain international footballers
1966 FIFA World Cup players
CD Condal players